James "Chico" Hernandez (born April 14, 1954) is an accomplished athlete in the sport of Sambo. He is the first Sambo champion to be featured on a box of Wheaties Energy Crunch and the first Sambo wrestler to appear in CNN/SI "Faces In the Crowd".

History 
Hernandez was born in the Heart of Chicago, in a community called Pilsen. Hernandez competed and wrestled for Reavis High School, Chicago State University, the University of Maine at Presque Isle, the US Army National Team, and the United States National Sambo Team. He is the First Sambo wrestler to be featured on Wheaties (Wheaties Energy Crunch). He won his first Gold medal at the Illinois Wrestling Federation South Suburban Freestyle Wrestling Championships in the 154 lbs weight class in April 1972. He won a Bronze medal at 154 lbs in the 1972 Amateur Athletic Union Illinois State Jr. Freestyle Wrestling Championships held at Loyola Academy. At the 1973 City of Chicago Park District City-Wide Open Wrestling Championships, Hernandez won the 155 lbs weight class finals.

In January 1975, he was awarded a wrestling scholarship to Chicago State University. He took second place at the 1976 National Association of Intercollegiate Athletics District #20 at 158 lbs. He qualified for the NAIA National Wrestling Championships held at Edinboro University in Edinboro, Pennsylvania. Hernandez transferred to the University of Maine at Presque Isle in August 1976. In November 1977, he won the Acadia University, Nova Scotia Open. In January 1979, he won first place at the University of New Brunswick International Open Championships in Fredericton, New Brunswick. Hernandez won first place at the 1979 USA Wrestling Maine State Freestyle Wrestling Championships, third place at the Northern New England Championships and fifth place at the National Collegiate Athletic Association Northeast Regional. He was a 3 time All-District selection in NAIA #5, 1979 All-New England and NCAA Northeast Regional Teams. The State of Maine AAU Olympic Freestyle Wrestling All-Star Team selected him to compete against the Netherlands Olympic Freestyle Wrestling Team. Hernandez graduated with a Bachelor of Arts degree in Social Science from the University of Maine at Presque Isle in May 1979.

Hernandez was named head wrestling coach at University of Maine at Presque Isle for the 1980-81 season. He coached 3 Northern New England Champions, 3 All-New England NAIA Wrestlers, 2 All-New England D-3 NCAA Wrestlers, and 3 NAIA National Qualifiers. He was selected as NAIA District 5 Wrestling Coach of the Year. He was the State of Maine Report Editor for WRESTLING USA Magazine in 1980–1981.

He enlisted in the United States Army in October 1981. In November 1982, he won the Fort Riley, Kansas Post Freestyle Wrestling Championship in the 158 lbs weight class. In January 1983, Hernandez was selected to the All-Army National Wrestling team at Ft. Bliss, Texas. Hernandez won a Bronze at the Texas Tech Wrestling Invitational and helped the Army National Team win the team title. In November 1983, he won his second Ft. Riley Post Wrestling Championship in the 158 lbs weight class and was selected the "Outstanding Wrestler" of the 3 day tournament.

In April 1984, he participated in the 1984 US Olympic Greco-Roman Wrestling Trials. Hernandez attended a Sambo clinic during the Olympic Trials, where he was introduced to the sport of Sambo . In April 1985, he won the USA Wrestling Vermont State Freestyle Championships in the 163 lbs weight class and in April 1986, he won the USA Wrestling Massachusetts State Freestyle Wrestling Championships in the 180 lbs weight class. In July 1986, he was a Bay State Games Freestyle Wrestling finalist.

Hernandez was named Outstanding Wrestler as he won his first United States National Sambo Championship in May 1987 at the Amateur Athletic Union National Sambo Championships held at Howard University Washington, D.C.. He won the AAU National Greco-Roman Masters Championships, the Greco-Roman Masters All-Around Championship and  placed 4th in the Greco-Roman Open.

In June 1989, Hernandez won 3 National AAU Medals at the Amateur Athletic Union National Masters and Open Free-Style Wrestling Championships held in Battle Creek, Michigan. He lost in the National Open Finals, took 2nd place in the All-Round Masters Division Finals and finished 4th in the Masters 35- to 40-year-old age group.

In July 1991, Hernandez won two Gold Medals at the 1991 Amateur Athletic Union National Masters Free-Style Wrestling Championships held in Battle Creek, Michigan.  He won the 35-39 age-group and the Masters All-Round Championships. He was selected for the "Most Outstanding Wrestler Award" of the tournament . Hernandez was named to WRESTLING USA "National Honor Roll of Champions" in 1983 and in 1992.

In 1995, he took fifth place as a member of the USA Wrestling National Veterans Team at the Fédération Internationale des Luttes Associées World Veterans Freestyle Wrestling Championships held in Sofia, Bulgaria.

Hernandez, at age 43, won three Gold medals, two Silvers and two Bronzes at the Grand National AAU Wrestling Championships. He participated in Sambo, Greco-Roman and Freestyle wrestling contested at the 3 day event in 1997, held at Rabobank Arena in Bakersfield, California.

In 1999, he won the 1999 Fédération Internationale Amateur de Sambo Pan-American Gold and Bronze medals in the 180 lbs weight class. Hernandez competed as a member of the USMC National Sambo Team which won the US National Sambo Team Championships held at Marine Corps Base Quantico in Quantico, Virginia, in 1999.

In April 2000, Hernandez won the XXV National AAU Sambo Championships held at Disney's Wide World of Sports Complex in Orlando, Florida. He won the Fédération Internationale Amateur de Sambo Pan-American Silver medal. In July 2000, the 46-year-old Hernandez won the middleweight (163 pounds), Gold medal in the 45-49 age group at the Federation International Association Sambo World Championships held at the Hara Arena in Dayton, Ohio. He also earned the Silver medal in the Masters of the Sport category, which combines champions from all masters’ age groups. He won a Bronze medal in the open division. He was selected to represent the US at the World Cup of Sombo in Nice, France. In November 2000, Hernandez led the United States to a second-place finish at the FIAS World Cup of Sambo Wrestling held in Nice, France, himself winning a Silver medal. In November 2001, Hernandez was selected again to represent the United States at the FIAS World Cup of Sambo held in Nice, France. He took 5th place. In November 2002, Hernandez was selected to the USA National Sambo Team to compete at the FIAS World Cup of Sambo but he could not participate due to military obligations.

In May 2003, he won 2 Gold medals at the 6th World AAU Iron Man Wrestling Championships in Open and Masters division held in Knoxville, Tennessee. Hernandez from 1987 to 2003 has achieved AAU All American status as a wrestler 31 times.

In 2004, 2005, and 2007, he represented the United States National Sambo Team at the FIAS British Sambo Championships held at the Swallows Leisure Centre,  Sittingbourne, Kent, England winning each time 3 Silver medals.

In June 2006, representing Team Irish, he won Gold and Silver medals at the North American Grappling Association New England Championships held at Bryant University. In November later that year; he won Silver and Gold medals at the North American Grappling Association Championships held at Sacred Heart University William H. Pitt Center in Fairfield, Connecticut.
 
In April 2008, at the North American Grappling Association's World Championships at Essex County College in Newark, New Jersey, Hernandez won a pair of world titles in the Executive Expert Heavy Weight NO-GI division. He won a Bronze No-Gi Championship by and the Silver Medal in the Gi competition.

Hernandez has won two Gold, three Silver, and a Bronze medal in Open and Masters Expert divisions at the Maine Skirmish competitions in 2003, 2005, and 2007 held at Winslow High School. 

In April 2009, he won a Silver medal in the Executive Expert Heavy Weight No-Gi North American Grappling Association's World Championships held at Essex County College in Newark, New Jersey. He won the Bronze medal in the Gi competition. 

In November 2009, Hernandez won a Bronze medal in the Executive Expert Heavy Weight division at the NAGA North American Grappling Championships held at Essex County College in Newark, New Jersey. He won the Bronze medal in the Gi Executive Expert Heavy Weight division competition. 

In July 2010, Hernandez won two Bronze medals at the FIAS Scottish Sambo Open and Championships held at the DG1 Leisure Centre, Dumfries and Galloway, Scotland.

On May 5, 2012, Hernandez won the Executive Expert Heavy Weight GI division at the NAGA Arizona State Grappling Championships held at Phoenix College in Phoenix, Arizona. He won a Silver medal in the Executive Expert Heavy Weight No-Gi Championship finals. 

In August 2013 in Jamestown, Ohio, Hernandez won the "Sambo Joe"/American Karate Ju-Jitsu Union National Sambo Championships.
At age 60, Hernandez won the 30-and-over master's division of the 2014 "Sambo Joe"/American Karate Ju-Jitsu Union National Sambo Championships, held August 2014 at Ohio University in Chillicothe, Ohio.

In May 2015, Hernandez won double Gold in both Greco-Roman Wrestling and in Olympic Freestyle at the 2015 USA Wrestling Veterans National Championships at the U.S. Open at the South Point Hotel, Casino & Spa, Las Vegas, Nevada. Earlier in April 2015, he was crowned at the 2015 Cliff Keen USA Wrestling Folkstyle Nationals in the Veterans divisions. The event was held at the UNIDome on the campus of the University of Northern Iowa in Cedar Falls.

On September 3, 2016, Hernandez won the NAGA Championships of Ireland in the Executive Expert Heavy Weight divisions in the GI and No-Gi competitions. He won a Silver medal in the Directors division in No-Gi competition. The Championships were held at the University Sports Complex of Dublin City University in Dublin, Ireland. Hernandez has 20 lifetime victories in NAGA Tournaments. 

In July 2017, Hernandez won two gold medals in his age group 50 & over and a bronze and 4th place competing against 20–30 years his junior in the heavyweight division at the Sunflower State Games American Folkstyle Wrestling Championships and Takedown Tournament held in the Kansas Expocenter, in Topeka, Kansas.

On October 20–21, 2018, Hernandez was selected by USA Sambo Inc. to represent the US at the World Masters Sambo Championships at the Stade Mohamed V, Casablanca Morocco. He competed in the 60-64 age group in the +100 kg weight class. Hernandez defeated Sakhtan Bekpeiisuly of Kazakhstan 5-3 for the Bronze medal.

Honors and awards
Hernandez was featured on a box of Wheaties Energy Crunch in December 2001. Hernandez was welcomed into the Wheaties Family by Olympic Champion Mary Lou Retton and Tiger Woods in Madison Square Garden, New York City, New York.

He was also featured in Sports Illustrated'''s "Faces in the Crowd" and CNN/SI "Faces in the Crowd".

Hernandez has been inducted into the Maine Sports Hall of Fame.

Hernandez was selected by the Rotary Club of Washburn, Maine, to serve as the Grand Marshal of the 22nd Annual Washburn August Festival Parade in 2002.

In October 2008, Hernandez was featured in the Scholastic textbook publication on the state of Maine called "Maine: America the Beautiful".

Hernandez was featured in Discover Maine'', "Maine's History Magazine" in 2010.

On November 4, 2010, the President of the American Sambo Association announced James "Chico" Hernandez to be the "Pioneer of American Sambo" Award winner for 2009.

The AAU Wrestling Executive Committee announce that James "Chico" Hernandez is a 2012 AAU Wrestling Hall of Fame Inductee.

Military 
Hernandez is a US Army Veteran of the Cold War and has also served honorably during the war eras of 1982 Lebanon War and Operation Urgent Fury (Grenada), Gulf War (Desert Shield, Desert Storm, Operation Enduring Freedom, and Operation Iraqi Freedom) and the War on Terrorism. He completed his Combat Basic Training at Fort Dix, New Jersey, in March 1982. He has served as a Combat Basic Training Instructor at the United States Military Academy in 2002-2005.
He has instructed at US Army Post Fort Leonard Wood, Missouri, from 1998-2002,
Fort Bragg, North Carolina, from 1995-1996, Fort Lewis, Washington in 1991 and Fort Indiantown Gap, Pennsylvania, from 1992-1994. He graduated from the premier class of the Soldier Physical Fitness Academy at Fort Benjamin Harrison, Indiana, in 1983 as a Master Fitness Trainer. He graduated from the Warrior Leader Course in Fort Riley, Kansas, in 1984, the Maine Military Academy in 1996, and the Vermont Military Academy in 1997. Hernandez during his US Army career was awarded the Physical Fitness Badge of Excellence a total 26 times. In 2003 he received a Challenge coin for his "Superior Performance as an Instructor" at West Point. Hernandez has served in the US Army from 1981 to 2014. He attained the rank of First Sergeant (1SG) during his military career.

References

1954 births
Living people
American male sport wrestlers
American masters athletes
American people of Cuban descent
American people of Greek descent
American people of Puerto Rican descent
American practitioners of Brazilian jiu-jitsu
American sambo practitioners
American wrestlers
American wrestling coaches
Chicago State Cougars wrestlers
Chicago State University alumni
People from Aroostook County, Maine
Sportspeople from Chicago
Sportspeople from Maine
UMPI Owls wrestlers
UMPI Owls wrestling coaches
United States Army soldiers
University of Maine at Presque Isle alumni